James Richard Ward (September 10, 1921 – December 7, 1941) was a US Navy sailor who was posthumously awarded the Medal of Honor for his actions during the attack on Pearl Harbor.

Biography
Ward enlisted in the United States Navy at Cincinnati, Ohio, on November 25, 1940. After basic training, he reported on board the battleship .

When the Japanese attacked Pearl Harbor on December 7, 1941, Oklahoma took three torpedoes soon after the attack began. She listed dangerously, and it was soon apparent that she would capsize. The order was given to abandon ship, but Seaman First Class Ward remained in a turret holding a flashlight, thus sacrificing his own life to permit other members of the crew to escape. For his heroism at that time, he posthumously received the Medal of Honor.

On August 19, 2021, the Defense POW/MIA Accounting Agency (DPAA) identified the remains of Seaman First Class James Richard Ward.

Medal of Honor citation
For conspicuous devotion to duty, extraordinary courage and complete disregard of his life, above and beyond the call of duty, during the attack on the Fleet in Pearl Harbor by Japanese forces on 7 December 1941. When it was seen that the U.S.S. Oklahoma was going to capsize and the order was given to abandon ship, Ward remained in a turret holding a flashlight so the remainder of the turret crew could see to escape, thereby sacrificing his own life.

Namesake
In 1943, the destroyer escort , was named in honor of Seaman First Class Ward.

See also

List of Medal of Honor recipients for World War II

References

External links

United States Navy Medal of Honor recipients
People from Springfield, Ohio
United States Navy sailors
United States Navy personnel killed in World War II
1921 births
1941 deaths
World War II recipients of the Medal of Honor